Pratima Chandrakar is a politician from the Indian National Congress party.  She was a Member of the Chhattisgarh Legislative Assembly representing Durg Rural Assembly constituency.

References

Living people
Indian National Congress politicians from Chhattisgarh
United Progressive Alliance candidates in the 2019 Indian general election
Year of birth missing (living people)
Women in Chhattisgarh politics